Mudnester can refer to any of the following species of birds:

 The magpie-lark
 A member of the bird family Corcoracidae

Animal common name disambiguation pages